Qayeh Chaman (also known as Qarah Chaman and Qareh Chaman) is a village in Fuladlui Jonubi Rural District, Hir District, Ardabil County, Ardabil Province, Iran. At the 2006 census, its population was 145, in 27 families.

References 

Tageo

Towns and villages in Ardabil County